Brimstone Howl is a punk blues band based in Omaha, Nebraska. They are often called "garage rock", although the band members themselves reject the term. Brimstone Howl has had numerous lineup changes since its inception.

Music
In early 2005, Brimstone Howl released an album entitled Seven Mean Runs on SPEED! Nebraska Records. Later that year the band released their second album Bang! Bang! Bang! Bang! Bang! Bang! Bang! on SPEED! Nebraska. In 2006 the band released four singles on Boomchick, SPEED! Nebraska, and Obsolete Records. Single Blood on the Rocks, Bones in the River was recorded and mixed by Jay Reatard and became the best-selling single in Boomchick Records history. Their next album, Guts of Steel, was released in May 2007 on Alive Records and produced by Dan Auerbach of The Black Keys. Their latest album, We Came in Peace (Alive Records) was recorded by Jim Diamond and released on September 16, 2008.

Fourth Album
Brimstone Howl released a fourth full-length album, titled Big Deal. What’s He Done Lately? with Alive Records on October 26, 2009.

Reputation
Brimstone Howl has earned a reputation for being a prolific and hard working band.  They have continued to release singles from 2007-2010. They have been touring the U.S. relentlessly for three years and toured Europe twice in 2008. Additionally, the band's songs have been used in the television shows Supernatural and Friday Night Lights.

Discography

Albums
Seven Mean Runs - CD (SPEED! Nebraska Records, 2005)
Bang! Bang! Bang! Bang! Bang! Bang! Bang! - CD (SPEED! Nebraska Records, 2005)
Guts of Steel - CD/LP (Alive Records, 2007)
We Came in Peace - CD/LP (Alive Records, 2008)
Big Deal. What’s He Done Lately? - CD/LP (Alive Records, 2009)
Blowhard Deluxe - LP (Deadbeat Records, 2013)
Magic Hour - LP/Cassette (Certified PR Records, 2013)

Singles
M60 - 7" (Boomchick Records, 2006)
Blood on the Rocks, Bones in the River - 7" (Boomchick Records, 2006)
Heat of the Beat - 7" (SPEED! Nebraska Records, 2006)
Rattle - 7" (Obsolete Records, 2006)
Uptight - 7" (SYA Records, 2007)
Tunnel of Love - 7" (Boomchick Records, 2008)
Euro Tour Single - 2x7" (P Trash/Red Lounge Records, 2008)
Mammon - 7" (Rob's House Records, 2009)
split with Hell Shovel - 7" : "Cross Wind" (Certified PR Records #CPR014, 2010)
Singles Collection - Cassette (Rainy Road Records #RRT-002, 2010)

External links
Brimstone Howl MySpace page
Alive Records
Boom Chick Records
SPEED! Nebraska Records
Certified PR Records
Rainy Road Records

Punk blues musical groups
Rock music groups from Nebraska
Alive Naturalsound Records artists